Aage Foss (18 May 1885 – 8 February 1952) was a Danish film actor. He appeared in 29 films between 1933 and 1951.

Selected filmography
 Flight from the Millions (1934)
 København, Kalundborg og - ? (1934)
 The Golden Smile (1935)
 Jens Langkniv (1940)
 The Invisible Army (1945)
 Mosekongen (1950)
 Frihed forpligter (1951)

External links

1885 births
1952 deaths
Danish male film actors
People from Aarhus